The following highways in Virginia have been known as State Route 66:

 State Route 66 (Virginia 1933-1940), now part of U.S. Route 58 Alternate
 State Route 66 (Virginia 1940-1958), now State Route 65
 Interstate 66 (Virginia), 1957–present